Shahira Abdulhakim El-Alfy (born February 22, 1977) is an Egyptian table tennis player. She represented Egypt in 2000 Summer Olympics in Sydney, where she competed in women's singles event in table tennis competition.

Olympic participation

Sydney 2000

Group stage – Group O

Final Standing: 49T

References

1977 births
Living people
Egyptian female table tennis players
Table tennis players at the 2000 Summer Olympics
Olympic table tennis players of Egypt
Egyptian women
21st-century Egyptian women